Bhudev Mukhopadhyay (1827–1894) was a writer and intellectual in 19th century Bengal. His works were considered ardent displays of nationalism and philosophy in the period of the Bengal renaissance. His novel Anguriya Binimoy (1857) was the first historical novel written in Bengal.

Early life
He was born at 37, Haritaki Bagan Lane in North Kolkata on 22 February 1827 to Pandit Biswanath Tarkabhusan, a renowned Sanskrit scholar. His ancestral village was Natibpur (Khanakul) in Hooghly District. He was a student of Sanskrit College and Hindu College, studying at the same time as other Bengal renaissance figures such as Michael Madhusudan Dutt. After completing his education at Hindu College, Bhudev became the headmaster of the Hindu Hitarthi School in 1846. He later founded Chandannagar Seminary and taught there. In 1848, he joined Calcutta Madrasa(Madrasa 'Aliya) as English teacher. In 1856, he was selected for the post of Principal of Hooghly Normal School through a competitive examination for which his former class-mate Michael Madhusudan Dutt was also a candidate.

Later career
In 1862 he was appointed Assistant Inspector of Schools. He was appointed as the first Indian headmaster of Howrah Zilla School.  He was later appointed Inspector of Schools and served in the states of Bengal, Bihar and Odisha. Recognizing his services, Mukhopadhyay was awarded the CIE (Companion of the Order of the Indian Empire) in 1877 by the British.

In 1882 he was appointed as Director of Public Instruction and was also nominated to the Lt.-Governor's Council and the Education Commission later that year. Mukhopadhyay retired from public service in 1883. He was also involved with several educational journals including Shiksadarpan O Sangbadsar and the Education Gazette, which he edited. This involvement lasted from 1868 until his retirement.

His sense of nationalism was so strong that the English principal of Presidency College once noted, "Bhudev with his CIE and 1500 a month is still anti-British."

Writings
Mukhopadhyay was a renowned writer and thinker and combined nationalism with rationalism in his works. He strived to reform Hindu customs and family laws to synergize with modern times. He had an immense knowledge of Sanskrit, as evidenced by his numerous essays, and critiques of Sanskrit literature. He wrote several books for young people, historical novels and fused many different philosophies into characters he portrayed.

Works

 Paribarik Prabandha (1882) - essay
 Samajik Prabandha (1892) - essay
 Achar Prabandha (1895) - essay
 Prakrtik Bijnan (in two parts, 1858 & 1859) - Book
 Purabrttasar (1858) - Book
 Englander Itihas (1862) - Book
 Romer Itihas (1862) - Book
 Banglar Itihas (3rd Part, 1904) - Book
 Ksetratattva (1862) - Book
 Puspanjali (1st part, 1876) - Book
 Anguriya Binimoy (1857) - Novel
 Aitihasik Upanyas (1857) - Historical Novel
 Svapnalabdha Bharatbarser Itihas (1895) - Novel

References

Notes

1827 births
1894 deaths
Presidency University, Kolkata alumni
The Sanskrit College and University alumni
University of Calcutta alumni
Bengali writers
Bengali Hindus
19th-century Bengalis
Bengali novelists
Bengali philosophers
Indian civil servants
Indian writers
Indian male writers
Indian novelists
Indian male novelists
Indian historical novelists
Indian educators
Indian editors
Indian magazine editors
Indian non-fiction writers
Indian male non-fiction writers
Indian theologians
19th-century Indian writers
19th-century Indian male writers
19th-century Indian novelists
19th-century Indian educators
19th-century Indian philosophers
19th-century Indian non-fiction writers
Hindu philosophers and theologians
19th-century Hindu philosophers and theologians
People from West Bengal
Educators from West Bengal
Novelists from West Bengal
Writers from Kolkata
Companions of the Order of the Indian Empire
Indian historical fiction writers